Marcus Livius Drusus may refer to:
 Marcus Livius Drusus Aemilianus, father of the general Gaius Livius Drusus and Marcus Livius Drusus the consul of 147 BC
 Marcus Livius Drusus, Roman consul in 147 BC
 Marcus Livius Drusus, Roman reformer and adoptive grandfather of empress Livia
 Marcus Livius Drusus Claudianus, father of empress Livia
 Marcus Livius Drusus Libo, adoptive brother of empress Livia